Excelsior is an extinct town in Atchison County, in the U.S. state of Missouri. The GNIS classifies it as a populated place, but the precise location of the town site is unknown.

The community took its name from the nearby Excelsior Mill. Besides the mill, the community contained a schoolhouse.

References

Ghost towns in Missouri
Former populated places in Atchison County, Missouri